The Dartmouth Big Green represent Dartmouth College in ECAC women's ice hockey during the 2017–18 NCAA Division I women's ice hockey season.

Offseason

May 10: 2016-17 Head Coach Laura Schuler was named head coach of the 2018 Canadian Olympic Team
June 30: Former St. Lawrence men's coach will act as the interim head coach for the 2017-18 season.  Marsh led his team to the NCAA Tournament 8 times in his 27 years, including the 1988 Championship game.

Recruiting

2017–18 Big Green

Standings

2017-18 Schedule

|-
!colspan=12 style="  style="background:#00693e; color:white;"| Regular Season

Awards and honors
 Christine Honor, 2017-18 Honorable Mention All-Ivy

References

Dartmouth
Dartmouth Big Green women's ice hockey seasons